Imurana Abdul Karim (also known as Capasta or Capasta Ambandi) is a Ghanaian musician, songwriter, rapper, performer, and FIFA-licensed football coach. He is noted for Gasmilla Telemo song ft Capasta Ambandi in 2014, Control in 2015, Badanaya ft Gasmilla in 2016, Bulaala ft Epixode and Article One in 2017, Gucci Ferrari, On Me, Father, Wrong Number, and  Kuzo Muyi Wasa (VIP cover), he was named in the list of artists picked by MTV Base (DStv channel 322). As a football coach, he has won nine titles with Under 13 teams. He won 2 trophies in Denmark,  3 trophies in Sweden, 3 trophies in Norway,  and 1 trophy in France.

Career

Music career 
Capasta began his career in music during his senior high school days. He made his entry into the music scene in 2014 when he was featured on Gasmilla's song Telemo in  In December 2015, he performed on stage at the Miss Galaxy Ghana beauty pageant at the Zenith University College auditorium.

He also set to release his first Studio Album which he titled "It's Time" with the hashtag( #ItsTime) on the 17th of February 2023 which will be available on all digital streaming platforms.

Coaching career 
Capasta is also the head coach and soccer administrator at the Lizzy Sports Complex. He has a FIFA coaching license and took his Under-12 team to win the World Youth Cup in Norway in 2017. In 2018, he also led his team to win the Paris World Games in Paris, France. On 1 February 2023 he signed a coaching contract with IK Junkeren Bodo sports club.

Nomination 
In August 2016, Capasta was nominated in the first edition of the Hausa Music Festival and Awards which was covered by BBC Hausa Service alongside Shatta Wale, Stonebwoy, Samini and others.

Discography 
 Telemo ft Gasmilla (2014)
 Badabaya (2015)
 Control (2015)
 Blessings (2019)
 Gucci Ferrari (2019)
 On Me (2020)

References 

Living people
Ghanaian musicians
Ghanaian rappers
Year of birth missing (living people)